Rhabdophis adleri is a species of keelback snake in the family Colubridae. The species is endemic to China.

Etymology
The specific name, adleri, is in honor of American herpetologist Kraig Adler.

Geographic range
R. adleri is found on Hainan Island, China.

Habitat

Diet
R. adleri preys upon fishes and frogs.

Reproduction
R. adleri is oviparous.

References

Further reading
Mori A, Jono T, Ding L, Zhu G-X, Wang J, Shi H-T, Tang Y (2016). "Discovery of Nucho-Dorsal Glands in Rhabdophis adleri ". Current Herpetology 35 (1): 53–58.
Zhao E (1997). "A New Species of Rhabdophis (Serpentes: Colubridae) from Hainan Island, China". Asiatic Herpetological Research 7: 166–169. (Rhabdophis adleri, new species).
Zhao E (2006). [Snakes of China ]. Hefei, China: Anhui Science and Technology Press. Volume I, 372 pp. Volume II, 280 pp., color plates. . (in Chinese). 

Rhabdophis
Snakes of Southeast Asia
Reptiles of China
Endemic fauna of China
Reptiles described in 1997